"Scooby Snacks" is a song by American band Fun Lovin' Criminals from their debut album, Come Find Yourself (1996). The song was written by the band and contains several sampled quotes from Quentin Tarantino films, so Tarantino is also credited as a writer. Most of the song is rapped, with the exception of the chorus, which is sung. The "Scooby Snacks" in the song is a reference to diazepam, also known as Valium.

"Scooby Snacks" is the band's biggest hit single to date, reaching the top 40 in Australia, Iceland, Ireland, the Netherlands, and New Zealand. In the United Kingdom, the song originally peaked at number 22 in August 1996, but after being reissued with a cover of the 10cc song "I'm Not in Love", it reached a new peak of number 12 on the UK Singles Chart in June 1997. In 1996, it was voted number 14 on the list of the Hottest 100 songs of that year by listeners of Australia's Triple J radio station.

Samples
The song contains samples from Quentin Tarantino's movies Pulp Fiction and Reservoir Dogs. Tarantino demanded 37% of the song's royalties and a co-writing credit, which he received.

Chart performance
"Scooby Snacks" reached the top 40 in Australia, Iceland, the Netherlands and on the US Billboard Modern Rock Tracks chart. It reached the top 20 in New Zealand, peaking at number 18. The song initially peaked number 22 on the UK Singles Chart but was re-released as a double A-side with their cover of 10cc's "I'm Not in Love" on 23 June 1997, reaching a new peak of number 12 the following week. This version also reached number 27 in Ireland. In July 2022, the song was certified silver by the British Phonographic Industry (BPI) for sales and streams exceeding 200,000 units.

Track listings

1996 release

UK CD1
 "Scooby Snacks" (album version) – 3:02
 "Smoke 'Em" (live)
 "Come Find Yourself" (live)
 "I Can't Get with That" (live)

UK CD2
 "Scooby Snacks" (album version—clean version) – 3:02
 "Scooby Snacks" (Steve Lironi master mix) – 3:16
 "Scooby Snacks" (20 Mg version) – 3:46
 "Scooby Snacks" (Rockamental version) – 2:57

UK limited-edition 7-inch picture disc
A1. "Scooby Snacks" (album version—clean version) – 3:04
B1. "Scooby Snacks" (Steve Lironi instrumental with movie samples) – 3:13
B2. "I'll Be Seeing You" – 1:19

European CD single
 "Scooby Snacks" (album version) – 3:02
 "Blues for Suckers" – 3:50

Australian CD single
 "Scooby Snacks" (album version)
 "Scooby Snacks" (Steve Lironi master mix)
 "Scooby Snacks" (20 Mg version)
 "Scooby Snacks" (Rockamental version)
 "Scooby Snacks" (Steve Lironi instrumental)
 "I'll Be Seeing You"

1997 release

UK CD1
 "Scooby Snacks" (album version) – 3:04
 "I'm Not in Love" – 4:36
 "Scooby Snacks" (live at the Forum) – 3:15
 "I Can't Get with That (live at the Forum) – 4:53

UK CD2
 "I'm Not in Love" – 4:36
 "Scooby Snacks (Schmoove version) – 3:25
 "Bombin' the L (Circa 1956 version) – 2:29
 "Coney Island Girl (Schmoove version) – 3:08

UK 7-inch single
A1. "I'm Not in Love" – 4:36
A2. "Scooby Snacks" (album version) – 3:04
B1. "Coney Island Girl" (Schmoove version) – 3:08

Credits and personnel
Credits are lifted from the 1996 UK CD1 liner notes.

Studios
 Recorded at Steve Rosenthals Magic Shop (New York City)
 Pre-produced at Drunk Munk Studios (New York City)
 Mixed at Platinum Island (New York City)
 Mastered at Sterling Sound (New York City)

Personnel

 Fun Lovin' Criminals – writing, production, arrangement
 Quentin Tarantino – writing
 Tim Latham – recording, mixing
 Juan Garcia – recording assistant
 Ed Douglas – recording assistant
 Steve "Puffy" Coffey – mixing assistant

 George Marino – mastering
 Morph Iconography – artwork layout and design
 Doctor Revolt – illustration
 Henry Marquez – art direction
 Jonathan Block – management
 Major Music – management

Charts

Weekly charts

Year-end charts

Certifications

Release history

References

1996 singles
Chrysalis Records singles
Cultural depictions of Quentin Tarantino
EMI Records singles
Fun Lovin' Criminals songs
Songs about criminals
Songs based on speech samples
Songs written by Quentin Tarantino